Affin Hwang Capital is the brand name of Affin Hwang Investment Bank Berhad, a specialist Malaysian-based investment banking group, formed in September 2014.

Affin Hwang Capital provides capital markets advisory and execution services in investment banking, institutional and retail securities, and asset management.

The group is composed of two core entities, Affin Hwang Investment Bank Berhad (investment banking and securities) and Affin Hwang Asset Management Berhad (asset management). It is among the largest brokerages and asset managers in Malaysia.

Affin Hwang Investment Bank Berhad is a fully owned subsidiary of Affin Holdings Berhad, a financial services conglomerate, which is listed on the Bursa Malaysia.

The business has primary offices in Kuala Lumpur and Penang.

AIIMAN Asset Management Sdn. Bhd. ("AIIMAN") is a subsidiary of Affin Hwang Capital, specialising in Shariah-compliant asset management.

Affin Hwang Capital has head offices in Kuala Lumpur and Penang, Malaysia.

History

In January 2014, Affin Holdings Berhad announced plans to acquire Hwang-DBS Investment Bank Berhad and the asset management and futures businesses of Hwang-DBS. Affin Holdings Berhad paid RM1,363 million for the acquisition, which was completed on 7 April 2014. The subsequent merger of Affin Investment Bank Berhad and Hwang-DBS, which was completed on 22 September 2014, created a new investment banking group, Affin Hwang Investment Bank Berhad, operating under the brand name of Affin Hwang Capital.

Prior to the formation of Affin Hwang Capital, Affin Investment Bank entered into a partnership with Japanese investment bank, Daiwa Securities Group Inc. on 13 December 2013. The agreements of partnership were carried over to Affin Hwang Capital.

In 2015, Affin Hwang Capital and Thai-based Thanachart Securities PCL entered a strategic business alliance for collaboration in the area of institutional equities trading and research. Thanachart Securities is a wholly owned subsidiary of Thanachart Bank.

Subsequently, in 2016, Affin Hwang Capital signed a business alliance with PT Bahana Securities, a wholly owned securities subsidiary of PT Bahana Pembinaan Usaha Indonesia. The joint distribution and marketing agreement enables Affin Hwang Capital to work jointly with Bahana to distribute Indonesian securities to clients in Malaysia.

References

 

2014 establishments in Malaysia
Banks of Malaysia
Malaysian brands
Investment banks
Asset management
Securities (finance)